The 2022–23 Bentley Falcons men's ice hockey season was the 46th season of play for the program, the 24th at the Division I level, and the 20th in the Atlantic Hockey conference. The Falcons represented Bentley University and were coached by Ryan Soderquist, in his 21st season.

Season
With more than half of the players from the previous season's team departing, coach Soderquist had his work cut out for him. The new lineup displayed some obvious deficiencies early in the year, both on the offense and defense. The result was a rather poor record and a last-place position in the conference standings. Once the team returned from the winter break, they seemed to have built some amount of chemistry and produced a surprising upset over Northeastern.

The Falcons were much better in the second half of the season and nearly posted a .500 record in 2023. Towards the end of the season they were able to produce wins over both American International and RIT, the top two teams in the conference. One of the big keys to this was the emergence of Connor Hasley as the team's starting goaltender. Unfortunately, because of both their bad start and the fact that Atlantic Hockey had altered its playoff format for this season to eliminate the First Round, Bentley's 9th-place finish left them out of the bracket and without a single playoff game.

Departures

Recruiting

Roster
As of June 30, 2022.

|}

Standings

Schedule and results

|-
!colspan=12 style=";" | Regular Season

Scoring statistics

Goaltending statistics

Rankings

Note: USCHO did not release a poll in weeks 1, 13, or 26.

References

Bentley Falcons men's ice hockey seasons
Bentley
Bentley
Bentley
Bentley